Yuriy Mykolayovych Bereza (born 8 February 1970) is a Ukrainian politician and the commander of the Dnipro Battalion. In September 2014, he was awarded the Order of Bohdan Khmelnytsky, 3rd class. Representing People's Front, he was elected to the Verkhovna Rada in the 2014 Ukrainian parliamentary election. In the July 2019 Ukrainian parliamentary election Bereza was not re-elected. As an independent candidate in constituency 24 (in Dnipropetrovsk Oblast) he gained 7.55% of the vote and lost the election to Dmytro Kysylevskyi of the party Servant of the People (who won with 59.36% of the votes)

References

External link

1970 births
Living people
People from Dnipropetrovsk Oblast
Congress of Ukrainian Nationalists politicians
People's Front (Ukraine) politicians
Eighth convocation members of the Verkhovna Rada
Ukrainian military leaders
Pro-Ukrainian people of the 2014 pro-Russian unrest in Ukraine
Ukrainian military personnel of the war in Donbas
Recipients of the Order of Bohdan Khmelnytsky, 3rd class
Ukrainian nationalists
Ukrainian football chairmen and investors
SC Dnipro-1